Ievgeniia Spitkovska (born 10 May 1988) is a Ukrainian basketball player for BC Avanhard Kyiv and the Ukrainian national team.

She participated at the EuroBasket Women 2017.

References

Ukrainian women's basketball players
Sportspeople from Kharkiv
Point guards
1988 births
Living people